Elections to High Peak Borough Council in Derbyshire, England were held on 5 May 2011. All of the council was up for election and the control of the council changed from Conservative control to no overall control. Overall turnout was 44.11%.

After the election, the composition of the council was:
Labour 21
Conservative 15
Liberal Democrat 3
Independent 4

Election result

Ward results

References

2011
2011 English local elections
2010s in Derbyshire